A Golden Boy is a 2014 Italian comedy-drama film written and directed by Pupi Avati. It won the Best Screenplay Award at the 2014 Montreal World Film Festival.

Plot
The film follows Davide (Riccardo Scamarcio), a copywriter whose father was a movie screenwriter. After his father's death, he leaves everything he has behind and moves to Rome, where he meets an actress-turned-publisher named Ludovica (Sharon Stone), who wants to release his father's autobiography.

Cast 
Riccardo Scamarcio as  Davide Bias
Sharon Stone as  Ludovica Stern 
Cristiana Capotondi as  Silvia
Giovanna Ralli as  Davide's Mother 
Lucia Rossi as  Beatrice
Christian Stelluti  as  Walter Van Vooren
Osvaldo Ruggieri as  Beppe Masiero 
 Tommaso Ragno as   Ludovica's Husband  
 Sandro Dori 	as Notaio
Fabio Ferrari 	as Agente letterario
Valeria Marini as Davide's Friend

Release
The film screened at the Montreal World Film Festival on 27 August 2014 and was released on 18 September 2014 in Italian cinemas, where it grossed US$807,225.

References

External links 

2014 films
2014 comedy-drama films
Italian comedy-drama films
Films directed by Pupi Avati
2010s Italian films